The 2014 Formula 4 Sudamericana season was the inaugural season of the Formula 4 Sudamericana. It began on 6 April in Polideportivo “Ciudad de Mercedes” and finished on 14 December in Autódromo Ciudad de Concordia after seven rounds.

Drivers

Race calendar and results

Championship standings

Points system
Points were awarded as follows:

Formula 4 Sudamericana
The championship was won by Brazilian driver Bruno Baptista, who was just one of two drivers, who competed in the series on the full-time basis.

Notes:
‡ — Double points were awarded in the final round at Autódromo Ciudad de Concordia.

References

External links
 

Fórmula 4 Sudamericana seasons
Formula 4 Sudamericana
2014 in South American sport